Have I Been Here Before? is an ITV daytime programme, presented by Phillip Schofield, made by ITV Productions. The programme offers celebrity guests the chance to see if they have lived before, in a past life. The celebrities are regressed by experienced therapist Andrea Foulkes, and in the process they often reveal some deeply intimate thoughts about their current lives.

Jules Hudson, a qualified historian and archaeologist, investigates the historical accuracy of the regression, to establish any credibility for the past life recounted.

Phillip Schofield then reveals the results of the investigation to the celebrity, and discusses any effects they feel the experience has had on their life.

Episodes

Series 1 (2005)

Series 2 (2007)

External links

AndreaFoulkes.co.uk

2005 British television series debuts
2007 British television series endings
2000s British reality television series
ITV (TV network) original programming
Television series by ITV Studios
English-language television shows